Maurice de Féraudy (born in Joinville-le-Pont on December 3, 1859 - died in Paris May 12, 1932) was a French songwriter, stage and film director, and actor at the Comédie-Française. He was the father of actor Jacques de Féraudy.

Life and career
He joined the Théâtre Français in 1880, the company in 1887,  and became dean in 1929. The role of his life, which he played 1200 times in nearly thirty years and of which he had a monopoly, is that of Isidore Lechat in Business is business (French: Les affaires sont les affaires), Octave Mirbeau (1903). As part of the Comedy Francaise he toured Quebec, Montreal and New York in 1922, showing two plays by Molière. 
He has been applauded in the use of comedy, his playing full of cheerfulness.

Féraudy also wrote the lyrics of many songs for Paulette Darty, including the famous Fascination, taken up by later by Suzy Delair and Diane Dufresne.

Selected filmography
1926 : The Clown as Circus director James Bunding
1929 : Ça aussi! ... c'est Paris 
1928 : Two Timid Souls as Thibaudier
1927 : Fleur d'amour as Maître Sourgueil
1926 : Lady Harrington as Bréhaut
 1926 : The Clown as James Bunding
1925 : Le Cœur des gueux as le Père Larue
1923 : The Secret of Polichinelle as Mr. Jouvenel
1923 : Cousin Pons de Jacques Robert as Pons
1922 : Crainquebille de Jacques Feyder as Crainquebille
1921 : Blanchette de René Hervil as Père Rousset
1920 :  In Old Alsace as de René Hervil
1913 : The Gaieties of the Squadron1913 : The Last Pardon''

References

External links

1859 births
1932 deaths
French songwriters
Male songwriters
French male stage actors
French male film actors
French male silent film actors
French film directors
Sociétaires of the Comédie-Française
20th-century French male actors